Geelong Province was an electorate of the Victorian Legislative Council 
until 2006, located around Geelong. It was abolished from the 2006 state election in the wake of the Bracks Labor government's reform of the Legislative Council. The area of the former Geelong Province then became part of the larger Western Victoria Region.

Members for Geelong Province

Eren went on to represent the Electoral district of Lara in the Victorian Legislative Assembly from 25 November 2006.

Election results

References

Former electoral provinces of Victoria (Australia)
1976 establishments in Australia
2006 disestablishments in Australia